Kepler-421 (KOI-1274 A) is a yellow main sequence star, being of spectral class G7V. Orange star of spectral class K9V (KOI-1274 B), projected on sky plane just 1.085″ away, is not physically associated to it. The distance to star KOI-1274 A is approximately 1150 light-years, and to KOI-1274 B is about 1900 light-years.

Planetary system
Kepler-421 (either KOI-1274 A or KOI-1274 B) has an exoplanet (Kepler-421b), which is notable for its position near the snow line.

References

G-type main-sequence stars
1274
K-type main-sequence stars
J18530163+4505159
Planetary transit variables
Planetary systems with one confirmed planet
Lyra (constellation)